"Take This Heart of Mine" is a song written by The Miracles members Warren "Pete" Moore, William "Smokey" Robinson and Marv Tarplin, produced by Robinson and released as a single by American soul singer Marvin Gaye, on  Motown Records 'Tamla label in 1966.

Background
Released in succession of three consecutive singles by Gaye helmed by the Miracles team from his Moods of Marvin Gaye album, the song took on a slightly different musical mix than the previous three. A little upbeat from the previous two singles, this song has the narrator describing how his love "is better than the tale of Jack and Jill" and how its prescription fills up better than a doctor's among other things.
Billboard said of the song that it was an "exceptional dance beat tune with solid Detroit
sound and well-written lyric [and] has more excitement than [Gaye's] previous hit, 'One More Heartache.'"  Cash Box described the song as a "rollicking, rhythmic, chorus-backed pop-r&b romantic handclapper."

Personnel
Lead vocals by Marvin Gaye
Background vocals by The Andantes
Written by Warren "Pete" Moore, William "Smokey" Robinson and Marv Tarplin
Produced by William "Smokey" Robinson
Guitar by Marv Tarplin
Other instrumentation by The Funk Brothers

Chart performance
Unlike Marvin Gaye's  previous three releases , "Take This Heart of Mine", fell short of reaching the pop top forty peaking at number 44 on the Billboard Hot 100 but reached number ten on the R&B singles chart making it the fourth consecutive top ten hit on Moods...

Popular culture
In 1966, Marvin sang this song on his only appearance on The Ed Sullivan Show.

References

1966 singles
Marvin Gaye songs
Songs written by Smokey Robinson
Songs written by Warren "Pete" Moore
Songs written by Marv Tarplin
Tamla Records singles
Song recordings produced by Smokey Robinson
1966 songs